Oakdale Commons (formerly Oakdale Mall) is an enclosed super-regional shopping mall in Johnson City, New York, United States, serving the Binghamton metropolitan area. The mall opened in 1975, by the development company, Interstate Properties. 

The half century old shopping concourse has featured the traditional retailers JCPenney, as well as Dick's House of Sport. It  has featured the notable specialty retailers American Eagle, Bath & Body Works, Express and Hollister.

The later 2010's saw several storied traditional department store retailers update its brick-and-mortar divisions after being disrupted by several digital retailers in recent years.

In 2017, Macy's (operated as Kaufmann's at the mall since 1996 until 2006), which also maintains several additional and much larger outposts next to Albany and Syracuse, announced as part of a strategy to focus on their highest achieving locations that they would be leaving this regional shopping concourse. The space is set to become a Dick's House of Sports, a specialty concept by Dick's Sporting Goods by 2023.

In 2017, it was announced Sears would shutter as part of an ongoing plan to phase out of brick-and-mortar. The store was reconstructed to feature "Factory by Beer Tree" a restaurant offering two levels of indoor and outdoor dining space, and Lourdes Health and Fitness which includes three large salt water pools, a steam room and sauna, and an enormous fitness floor.

In August, 2018, it was announced regional division The Bon-Ton would shutter as part of bankruptcy. On February 27, 2023 demolition began on the original Bon-Ton to prepare for a new tenant which is expected to be completed by June 1st. A new "national tenant" plans to build out a 99,000-square-foot structure. On March 10, 2023, it was revealed that the tenant is an additional outpost for the premier national retailer BJ's Wholesale Club.

In September 2022, Burlington announced it would transition to a nearby location at Town Square Mall in Vestal.

On October 14, 2022 , it was reported the mall envisions a $117 million plan to further develop the concourse while incorporating the rest of the mall, known simply as Oakdale Commons. The mall developer proclaimed "We have significant plans for further development".

References

Shopping malls in New York (state)
Shopping malls established in 1975
Buildings and structures in Broome County, New York
Tourist attractions in Broome County, New York
1975 establishments in New York (state)